Chamberlayne is a surname. Notable people with the surname include:

 Edward Chamberlayne (1616–1703), English writer
 Tankerville Chamberlayne (1840–1924), English Member of Parliament
 Thomas Chamberlayne (disambiguation) several men with this name
 William Chamberlayne (poet) (1619–1679), English poet 
 William Chamberlayne (MP) (1760–1829), English Member of Parliament and landowner
 The Chamberlayne family, an influential family of Weston, Southampton, United Kingdom

 The Chamberlayne family, an influential family in Virginia, descended from William Chamberlayne (burgess) of Hereford who settled in New Kent County, Colony of Virginia

English-language surnames
Occupational surnames
English-language occupational surnames